Borajet was a privately owned Turkish airline based in Yeşilköy, Bakırköy, Istanbul operating domestic and international services. It suspended operations on 24 April 2017.

History

Early years
The airline was founded in 2008 by Yalcin Ayasli, a Turkish businessman living in the US. Fatih Akol is chairman of the board. The company rented a hangar at Atatürk International Airport, Istanbul and then purchased three second-hand ATR 72-500 turboprop aircraft, which were delivered at the beginning of 2010.

Borajet received its "Regional Airline Operations License" on 22 April 2010 and started operations on 7 May 2010 with its first flight from  Istanbul to Tokat.

In 2014 Borajet agreed a deal to lease five Embraer 190 aircraft (with options on a further three) from GE Capital Aviation Services. In October 2016 Borajet announced long-term lease deals with AerCap for three Embraer 190-E2 and two Embraer 195-E2 aircraft, with deliveries to begin in 2018. In January 2017 the airline was sold to Sezgin Baran Korkmaz for 260 Million Dollars.

Suspension of operations
On 24 April 2017, Borajet announced that they will temporarily suspend their operations and 30,000 existing flight reservations would be transferred to Turkish Airlines. The airline stated maintenance issues as a reason for this move and plans to resume operations sometime during 2018 when Istanbul's new international airport becomes operational. In June 2017, a Turkish court ordered that seven aircraft of the company are to be seized.

As of January 2021, the airline did not resume its operations.

Destinations 

Prior to the suspension of operations in April 2017, Borajet served the following scheduled destinations. Several more airports in Europe and the Middle East were served as charters while more domestic destinations were operated on a wet-lease basis.

Germany
Berlin – Berlin Tegel Airport
Cologne/Bonn – Cologne Bonn Airport
Munich – Munich Airport

Greece
Mykonos – Mykonos Island National Airport
Rhodes - Rhodes International Airport

Iraq
Erbil - Erbil International Airport

Lebanon
Beirut - Beirut Rafic Hariri International Airport

Northern Cyprus
Nicosia - Ercan International Airport

Spain
Ibiza - Ibiza Airport

Turkey
Adana - Adana Şakirpaşa Airport
Alanya – Gazipaşa Airport
Ankara – Esenboğa International Airport
Antalya – Antalya Airport
Bodrum - Milas–Bodrum Airport
Çanakkale – Çanakkale Airport
Diyarbakır – Diyarbakır Airport
Edremit – Balikesir Koca Seyit Airport
Istanbul – Sabiha Gökçen International Airport Base
İzmir - Adnan Menderes Airport
Siirt – Siirt Airport

Codeshare agreements 
Borajet also maintained codeshare agreements with the following airlines:

AnadoluJet

Fleet 
As of April 2017 - prior to the suspension of operations-, the Borajet fleet included the following aircraft:

References

External links

 Official website 

Defunct airlines of Turkey
Airlines established in 2008
Airlines disestablished in 2017
Turkish companies established in 2008
2017 disestablishments in Turkey